Hep Stars on Stage (also referred to as simply On Stage) is the first live album and second overall release by Swedish rock band Hep Stars. Released in November 1965 on Olga Records, the album is composed of recordings made on 7 and 8 August 1965 at two separate Folkparks in Trollhättan and Västerås, Sweden. Hep Stars on Stage, although not the first live album by a Swedish artist, was the first live recording of a Swedish rock group released.

The album is composed of rock standards, including "What'd I Say", "Surfin' Bird" and "If You Need Me", but also features the band's hit singles of the time, such as the opening track, "Farmer John", "Bald Headed Woman", "No Response" and "So Mystifying", all of which had been hits on both Kvällstoppen and Tio i Topp. On "Cadillac", Lennart Fernholm, the band's tour manager, introduces the band by their nicknames, which were "Chrille" (Christer Pettersson), "Janne" (Janne Frisk), "Lelle" (Lennart Hegland), "Benne" (Benny Andersson) and "Svenne" (Svenne Hedlund).

Nonetheless the album became a huge success in Sweden, reaching number two on LP-Toppen (LP-Top) after The Beatles Rubber Soul. The album was a favorite of Per Gessle when he was younger. The album was remastered and re-issued in 1996, with added content, consisting of singles and B-sides.

Track listing

Personnel

The Hep Stars 
 Svenne Hedlund – lead vocals, co-lead vocals on "Whole Lot-ta Shak-in' Goin' On", backing vocals, tambourine,
 Janne Frisk – rhythm and lead guitar, lead vocals on "If You Need Me", co-lead vocals on "Whole Lot-ta Shak-in' Goin' On"
 Benny 'Benne' Andersson – Vox Continental organ, backing vocals
 Lennart 'Lelle' Hegland – bass guitar, backing vocals
 Christer 'Chrille' Pettersson – drums, lead vocals on "Surfin Bird", backing vocals

Other personnel 

 Lennart Fernholm – introduction
 Gert Palmcrantz – producer, sound recording
 Ulf H. Holmstedt – cover photography

References

External links 
 Hep Stars website

1965 live albums
Hep Stars albums